Carl Wilhelm Böttiger (15 May 1807 - 22 December 1878) was a Swedish writer.

Biography
He was born in Västerås, and studied at the University of Uppsala, where, after extensive travels, he was appointed professor of modern literature in 1845, and in 1858 professor of aesthetics, from which post he retired in 1867.

Work
He was exceedingly active as translator, poet, dramatist, and literary critic. Most of his publications in the latter capacity appeared among the Transactions of the Swedish Academy. It is perhaps by his verse that he is best known. His publications include:
 Lyriska stycken (Lyrical Pieces, 1837–39)
 Religiösa sånger (Religious Songs, 1841)
 Torquato Tasso, Gerusalemme Liberata, Swedish translation (1842–51)
 Dante, Divina Commedia, Swedish translation (1846–51).
 a biography of his father-in-law, Esaias Tegnér
His Samlade Skrifter (Collected Works) appeared at Stockholm (6 vols., 1856–81).

References

 

1807 births
1878 deaths
Uppsala University alumni
Academic staff of Uppsala University
Swedish translators
Swedish poets
Swedish male writers
Swedish literary critics
Members of the Swedish Academy
19th-century translators
Swedish male poets
19th-century Swedish poets
19th-century male writers
Burials at Uppsala old cemetery